Strepsinoma is a genus of moths of the family Crambidae. It was described by Edward Meyrick in 1897.

Species
Strepsinoma albimaculalis Rothschild, 1915
Strepsinoma albiplagialis Rothschild, 1915
Strepsinoma amaura Meyrick, 1897
Strepsinoma aulacodoidalis Rothschild, 1915
Strepsinoma croesusalis (Walker, 1859)
Strepsinoma ectopalis Hampson, 1897
Strepsinoma foveata Turner, 1937
Strepsinoma grisealis Rothschild, 1915
Strepsinoma sphenactis Meyrick, 1897
Strepsinoma tetralitha (Hampson, 1917)

References

 , 1999: Catalogue of the Oriental Acentropinae (Lepidoptera: Crambidae). Tijdschrift voor Entomologie 142 (1): 125-142.

External links
Natural History Museum Lepidoptera genus database

Acentropinae
Crambidae genera
Taxa named by Edward Meyrick